Liberation Square may refer to:

 Liberation Square, Baghdad in Iraq
 Liberation Square, a square in Saint Helier
 Congress Square in Ljubljana, Slovenia, formerly known as Liberation Square
 Liberation Square (Felszabadulás tér), former name of Ferenciek tere

See also
 Tahrir Square (disambiguation) (Arabic for Liberation Square)